Ricardo Emmanuel Rivera de León (born 17 April 1997) is a Puerto Rican footballer who plays as a forward for Union Omaha and the Puerto Rico national football team.

Career

Youth and college
Rivera played most of his youth career at Club Atlético de San Juan before moving to Valencia in 2015 where he played one year at Racing Algemesí. From 2016 to 2018, he played college soccer at UPR Mayagüez where he won the championship twice and earned awards including MVP and top goalscorer.

Senior career
In 2018, Rivera tried out and signed with Villamarxant CF of the Tercera División.

International
Ricardo was called up to the Puerto Rico national under-17 football team under manager Jeaustin Campos in 2012 for the FIFA World Cup Qualifiers. In 2016 he played for the Puerto Rico national under-20 football team. Same year he was called up and made his debut for the senior national team for friendly matches against Dominican Republic. In July 2019, he was called up for the Puerto Rico national under-23 football team for the 2020 CONCACAF Men's Olympic Qualifying Championship qualification. He scored the winning goal in the 93' minute on his debut against Antigua and Barbuda.

Rivera concluded the 2022 World Cup qualifiers as the team’s leader in goals, with four. Puerto Rico finished this stage second in their group, but only Saint Kitts and Nevis advanced.

International goals

References

Living people
1997 births
Puerto Rican footballers
Puerto Rico international footballers
Association football forwards
Union Omaha players
USL League One players
Sportspeople from San Juan, Puerto Rico